Seeland Region is one of five administrative regions of the canton of Bern, with a population of 66,000 (as of 2005) in 62 municipalities (Biel-Bienne 19 and Seeland 43 municipalities).

See also
 Subdivisions of the canton of Bern
 Seeland (Switzerland)

Regions of the canton of Bern